The Ritch–Carter–Martin House in Odum, Georgia, is a two-story wood-framed house that was built in c. 1915 and was listed on the National Register of Historic Places in 1998.  The listing included three contributing buildings.  It was the last surviving two-story Classical Revival house in Odum.

It was built by carpenter Paul Edward McCall for James Colquitt Ritch (1869–1944), on a corner location.  It was later the home of Miss Essie Moody Carter, who by 1988 had lived there for about 65 years.

The house was the location of the telephone exchange for Odum from the mid-1930s to 1965.  The exchange was bought by Miss Essie.  Miss Essie married Joe Martin, a telephone linesman, in 1937.

References

Houses on the National Register of Historic Places in Georgia (U.S. state)
Neoclassical architecture in Georgia (U.S. state)
Houses completed in 1930
National Register of Historic Places in Wayne County, Georgia